Arnold von Melchtal, also spelt Melchthal and otherwise Arnold von der Halden, was one of the three Eidgenossen, the legendary founding fathers of Switzerland. He represented the Canton of Unterwalden at the Rütlischwur.
 
Aegidius Tschudi in his Chronicon Helveticum tells Arnold's story as follows:

Notes

14th-century Swiss people